The Saluki Radio Network are radio stations in the U.S. states of Illinois, Missouri and Kentucky that broadcast Southern Illinois Salukis sports events. The network is managed by Learfield IMG College.

Current radio affiliates

References
 List of current affiliates on SIU's website

Southern Illinois Salukis
Sports radio networks in the United States 
College football on the radio 
College basketball on the radio in the United States
Learfield IMG College sports radio networks
 

es:Southern Illinois Salukis
fr:Southern Illinois Salukis